Charles Fletcher Lummis (March 1, 1859, in Lynn, Massachusetts – November 25, 1928, in Los Angeles, California) was a United States journalist, and an activist for Indian rights and historic preservation. A traveler in the American Southwest, he settled in Los Angeles, California, where he also became known as an historian, photographer, ethnographer, archaeologist, poet, and librarian.  Lummis founded the Southwest Museum of the American Indian.

Early life and career
Charles Fletcher Lummis was born in 1859, in Lynn, Massachusetts. He lost his mother at age 2 and was homeschooled by his father, who was a schoolmaster. Lummis enrolled in Harvard for college and was a classmate of Theodore Roosevelt's, but dropped out during his senior year. While at Harvard he worked during the summer as a printer and published his first work, Birch Bark Poems. This small volume was printed on paper-thin sheets of birch bark; he won acclaim from Life magazine and recognition from some of the day's leading poets. He sold the books by subscription and used the money to pay for college. A poem from this work, "My Cigarette", highlighted tobacco as one of his life's obsessions.

In 1880, at the age of 21, Lummis married Dorothea Rhodes of Cincinnati, Ohio.

Transcontinental walk
In 1884, Lummis was working for a newspaper in Cincinnati and was offered a job with the Los Angeles Times. At that time, Los Angeles had a population of only 12,000. Lummis decided to make the 3,507-mile journey from Cincinnati to Los Angeles on foot, taking 143 days, all the while sending weekly dispatches to the paper chronicling his trip. One of his dispatches chronicled his meeting and interview with famed outlaw Frank James. The trip began in September and lasted through the winter. Lummis suffered a broken arm and struggled in the heavy winter snows of New Mexico. He became enamored with the American Southwest, and its Spanish and Native American inhabitants. Several years later, he published his account of this journey in A Tramp Across the Continent (1892).

Editor at the Los Angeles Times
Upon his arrival, Lummis was offered the job of the first City Editor of the Los Angeles Times. He covered a multitude of interesting stories from the new and growing community. Work was hard and demanding under the pace set by publisher Harrison Gray Otis. Lummis was happy until he suffered from a mild stroke that left his left side paralyzed.

New Mexico
In 1888, Lummis moved to San Mateo, New Mexico to recuperate from his paralysis. He rode on the Plains while holding a rifle in one good hand and shooting jack rabbits. Here, he began a new career as a prolific freelance writer, writing on everything that was particularly special about the Southwest and Indian cultures. His articles about corrupt bosses committing murders in San Mateo drew threats on his life, so he moved to a new location in the Pueblo Indian village of Isleta, New Mexico, on the Rio Grande.

Pueblo People of Isleta
Somewhat recovered from his paralysis, Lummis was able to win over the confidence of the Isleta Pueblo, a Tiwa people, by his outgoing and generous nature. But a hit man from San Mateo was sent up to Isleta, where he shot Lummis but failed to kill him.

In Isleta, Lummis divorced his first wife and married Eva Douglas, who lived in the village and was the sister-in-law of an English trader. Somehow he convinced Eva to stay with Dorothea in Los Angeles until the divorce went through. In the meantime, Lummis became entangled in fights with the U.S. government agents over Indian education. In this period, the government was pushing assimilation and had established Indian boarding schools. It charged its agents with recruiting Native American children for the schools, where they were usually forced to give up traditional clothing and hair styles, and prevented from speaking their own languages or using their own customs. They were often prohibited from returning home during holidays or vacation periods, or their families were too poor to afford such travel. Lummis persuaded the government to allow 36 children from the Albuquerque Indian School to return to their homes.

While in Isleta, he made friends with Father Anton Docher from France; he was the missionary Padre of Isleta. They both also befriended Adolph Bandelier. While living in Isleta, Lummis boarded in the home of Juan Rey Abeita. In 1890, he traveled with Bandelier to study the indigenous people of the area.

Preservationist
As president of the Landmarks Club of Southern California (an all-volunteer, privately funded group dedicated to the preservation of California's Spanish missions), Lummis noted that the historic structures "...were falling to ruin with frightful rapidity, their roofs being breached or gone, the adobe walls melting under the winter rains."  Lummis wrote in 1895, "In ten years from now—unless our intelligence shall awaken at once—"there will remain of these noble piles nothing but a few indeterminable heaps of adobe. We shall deserve and shall have the contempt of all thoughtful people if we suffer our noble missions to fall."

Magazine editor

In 1892, Lummis published Some Strange Corners of Our Country, recounting some of the areas and sights he had discovered. Between 1893 and 1894, he spent 10 months traveling in Peru with Bandelier.

After the men's return, Lummis and Eva returned to Los Angeles with their year-old daughter, Turbese. Unemployed, Lummis landed the position of editor of a regional magazine, Land of Sunshine. The magazine was renamed Out West in 1901. He published  works by famous authors such as Jack London and John Muir. Over his 11 years as editor, Lummis also wrote more than 500 pieces for the magazine, as well as a popular monthly commentary called "In the Lion's Den".

Indian rights activist
Lummis also established a new Indian rights group called the "Sequoya League", after the noted early 19th-century Cherokee leader Sequoyah who developed a writing system for the Cherokee language. Lummis fought against the U.S. Bureau of Indian Affairs and called on his classmate President Teddy Roosevelt to help change their manner of operating. He found a home for a small group of Indians who had been evicted from their property in the Palm Springs, California area. The Sequoya League began a battle against Indian Agent Charles Burton, accusing him of imposing a "reign of terror" on the Hopi pueblo in Oraibi by requiring Hopi men to cut their long hair. It was their custom to wear it long, a practice with spiritual meaning. Lummis was accused of overstating the case against Burton and lost his welcome at the White House. (However, subsequent social pressure on Burton led him to reverse the haircutting policy.)

Later life
In 1905, Lummis took the position as City Librarian of the Los Angeles Public Library. Lummis replaced Mary Jones as City Librarian even though he had no prior library training. He was criticized for the way he ran the library and insisted on doing most of the work at home. He resigned from that sole source of income in 1911, and worked to establish the Southwest Museum while engaged in a bitter and public divorce with his wife Eva.

In that year Lummis went blind, which he attributed to a "jungle fever" contracted while in Guatemala exploring the Mayan ruins of Quiriguá.  After more than a year of blindness, during which he might appear in public with his eyes covered by a bandanna or wearing dark amber glasses, he regained his sight. Some privately doubted Lummis actually went blind. Among them was John Muir, who said so in a letter to him and encouraged him to get more rest.

In 1915, Lummis married his third wife, Gertrude, at El Alisal.

By 1918, he was destitute. In 1923, the Southwest Museum Board named him founder emeritus and gave him a small stipend. In 1925, Lummis also decided to enlarge, revise, and republish Some Strange Corners of Our Country as Mesa, Canyon and Pueblo. He also engaged in a renewed civil rights crusade on behalf of the Pueblo Indians.

Death
Lummis died November 25, 1928.  He was cremated, and his ashes were placed in a vault in a wall at El Alisal. Supporters bought his home El Alisal, which was until 2015 used as the headquarters of the Historical Society of Southern California.

Legacy and honors

Lummis' cultural influence remains today, including a lasting imprint on the Mount Washington neighborhood of Los Angeles. The home he built, The Lummis House, and the museum he founded, The Southwest Museum, are located within 0.7 miles of each other and remain open to the public for limited hours on weekends.

El Alisal (Lummis House) 

Lummis purchased a 3-acre plot around 1895 and spent 13 years building what would become a 4,000-square-foot stone home with an exhibition hall, calling it El Alisal. He frequently entertained, with parties he called "noises" for various writers, artists, and other prominent figures. The parties usually included a lavish Spanish dinner with dancing and music performed by his own private troubadour. The extravaganzas wore out a number of female assistants or "secretaries" conscripted into working on them.

The Lummis House was  donated to the Southwest Museum in 1910 and then sold in 1943 to the state of California, which transferred it to the city in 1971. The Historical Society of Southern California took occupancy in 1965, using it as headquarters and helping manage the property, eventually leaving in 2014. Open to the public as a museum and park on Saturdays and Sundays, the site also serves as a focus for Lummis Day activities (see below).

Southwest Museum
By 1907, Lummis had founded the Southwest Museum of Los Angeles, California. He had led the fundraising campaign to build a new structure for it and saw the building open in August 1914.

The Southwest Museum operated independently until 2003, when it was merged into the Autry Museum of the American West. The Autry launched a multi-year conservation project to preserve the enormous collection amassed by Lummis and his successors. Much of the material was moved off-site, but The Southwest Museum has maintained an ongoing public exhibit on Pueblo pottery that is free of charge and open on Saturdays only.

Lummis Day Festival
Beginning in 2006, the annual Lummis Day Festival was established by the Lummis Day Community Foundation. It holds the festival in Lummis' honor on the first Sunday in June, drawing people to El Alisal and Heritage Square Museum for poetry readings, art exhibits, music, dance performances, and family activities. The foundation is a non-profit organization of community activists and arts organization leaders.

Publications

 A New Mexico David and Other Stories & Sketches of The Southwest. Scribner's. 1891
 Some strange corners of our country: the wonderland of the Southwest. 1892
 A Tramp Across The Continent (1892)
 My Friend Will. 1894
 The Gold Fish of Gran Chimu: A Novel. Lamson, Wolffe. 1896
 The Enchanted Burro: Stories of New Mexico & South America. 1897
 The awakening of a nation: Mexico of to-day. 1898
 The King Of The Broncos and Other Stories of New Mexico. Scribner's. 1915
 The Spanish Pioneers And The California Missions (1936) Full book online at The Internet Archive. 1920
 The Prose of It (poem on Geronimo). c. 1926
 A Bronco Pegasus: Poems. Houghton Mifflin. 1928
 Flowers Of Our Lost Romance (1909) Full book online at The Internet Archive Houghton Mifflin. 1929
 New Mexican Folk Songs. UNM Press. 1952
 General Crook and the Apache Wars. 1966
 Bullying The Moqui. 1968
 Dateline Fort Bowie: Charles Fletcher Lummis Reports on an Apache War. 1979
 A Tramp Across the Continent. University of Nebraska Press. 1982. 
 Letters From The Southwest: September 20, 1884 to March 14, 1885. 1989
 Mesa, Cañon and Pueblo. University Press of the Pacific. 2004. 
 Pueblo Indian Folk-Stories. Forgotten Books. 2008. 
 The Land of Poco Tiempo. Charles Scribner's Sons. 1897.
 The Man Who Married the Moon and Other Pueblo Indian Folk Tales. (1891)

References

Bibliography
 
 
 
 
  208 p. (Devotes chapter XIV "Chas" to Lummis) Historical novel.

Further reading
   (devotes chapter 4 "The Showman with the Shining Right Hand" to Lummis)

External links
 
  Official website
  Official website
  Official site

Archival collections
 
 
 
"Guide to the Charles Lummis Photographs". Special Collections, The Claremont Colleges Library, Claremont, California.

Other

 
 
 
 Mark Thompson, author of American Character, a biography of Charles Fletcher Lummis
 Charles Fletcher Lummis Manuscript Collection at the Autry National Center
 Charles F. Lummis Page at Spirit of America
 "Charles F. Lummis" by Robert E. Fleming in the Western Writers Series Digital Editions at Boise State University
 Article, with archival photos, about Charles Fletcher Lummis – L.A. as Subject/KCET
 
 "Sunday's Lummis Fest Recalls Infancy of Los Angeles Cultural Venues" Los Angeles Times, May 30, 2012 

American explorers
American librarians
Arts and Crafts architects
Indigenous rights activists
Historians of Native Americans
1859 births
1928 deaths
Activists from California
Architects from Los Angeles
Artists from Los Angeles
Journalists from California
Los Angeles Times people
Photographers from California
Writers from Los Angeles
Arroyo Seco (Los Angeles County)
American Craftsman architecture in California
Arts and Crafts movement
19th century in Los Angeles
19th-century American architects
20th-century American architects
19th-century American historians
19th-century American male writers
20th-century American historians
19th-century American photographers
20th-century American photographers
American male non-fiction writers
Historians from California
People from Lynn, Massachusetts
People from Mount Washington, Los Angeles